Melese pumila is a moth of the family Erebidae. It was described by Paul Dognin in 1908. It is found in French Guiana, Suriname, Guyana, Brazil and Venezuela.

References

 

Melese
Moths described in 1908